Open access scholarly communication of Norway can be searched via the Norwegian Open Research Archive (NORA). "A national repository consortium, BIBSYS Brage, operates shared electronic publishing system on behalf of 56 institutions." Norwegian signatories to the international "Open Access 2020" campaign, launched in 2016, include CRIStin,  (Norwegian Institute of Bioeconomy Research, NIBIO), Norwegian Institute of Palaeography and Historical Philology, Norwegian University of Science and Technology, 

Repositories 
There are a number of collections of scholarship in Norway housed in digital open access repositories.

Timeline 

Key events in the development of open access in Norway include the following:
 2001
 26 November: Norwegian Wikipedia, an open educational resource, begins publication.
 2003
 Norsk Institutt for Palaeografi og Historisk Filologi signs the Berlin Declaration on Open Access to Knowledge in the Sciences and Humanities.
 2006
 Munin Conference on Scholarly Publishing begins in Tromsø.
 2007
 May: OpenAccess.no website launched.
 27 June: Ministry of Education and Research State Secretary Lisbet Rugtvedt endorses open access.
 November: National policy adopted "requiring government agencies to provide open access to any geodata they gather or produce."
 2009
 Research Council of Norway signs the Berlin Declaration.
 2010
 CRIStin (Current Research Information System in Norway) launched.
 2011
 18 February: University of Tromsø creates fund to cover author fees.
 2013
 Research Council of Norway pays for 40 open access journals.
 Norwegian University of Science and Technology creates fund to cover author fees.
 2017
 Comparative Research Programme on Poverty (CROP), a government agency, begins providing "open access to two of its publications: the CROP Series in International Poverty Poverty Studies and Global Challenges - Working Paper Series."

Notes

References

Further reading 

 . 2007-2011

External links 
 
 
 
 
 
 
 
 

Academia in Norway
Communications in Norway
Norway
Science and technology in Norway